Osmanabad, officially known as Dharashiv, is a city and a municipal council in Osmanabad district in the Indian state of Maharashtra. Osmanabad derived its name from the last ruler of Hyderabad, Mir Osman Ali Khan. This city is the administrative headquarter of Osmanabad district. It is the seventh largest city in Marathwada While 39th largest city in Maharashtra by population.

History and Etymology

The city Osmanabad derives its name from the last ruler of Hyderabad, the 7th Nizam, Mir Osman Ali Khan, of which the region was a part of until 1948. Osmanabad's history dates back to the era of the Ramayana, where the Hindu deity Rama is said to have spent a few years of his exile. As per historical evidence, the district was ruled by the Mauryas, Satavahanas, Rashtrakutas, and Yadavas. In early centuries the city belonged to the Hindu Chalukyas and Devagiri Yadavas, but later became a part of the Bahmani and Bijapur kingdoms.

For a period of time, Osmanabad was also ruled by the Mughals, Bahmani, Nizam and Adil Shah kingdoms. Before the Hyderabad Nizam's rule, it was under the control of the Mughal King Aurangzeb. Being under Nizam rule, the district did not celebrate its freedom when the rest of India became independent in 1947. However, in 1948, Hyderabad State was merged with independent India and the district became a part of the then Bombay State. It became a part of Maharashtra State when the State was formed in 1960. Osmanabad has a historical lineage dating back to the days of Marathwada, and even before that to several kingdoms of which the region was a part. 

The new name, Dharashiv, derives from the Dharashiv Caves

Geography
Osmanabad is located in the west-central part of Osmanabad Tahsil. Nearby towns include Tuljapur, Bhoom, Paranda, Washi, and Kalamb. Solapur, located southwest of Osmanabad in Solapur district, is the nearest sizable city. Osmanabad is on  the Balaghat Pathar. The Bhogavati River flows through the city and meets the Sina River near Mohol in the Solapur district.

Demographics
In the 2011 Indian census, the city of Osmanabad had 111,825 inhabitants, with 41,982 males (52.1%) and 38,643 females (47.9%), for a gender ratio of 920 females per one thousand males. In 2001, Osmanabad had an average literacy rate of 74%, higher than the national average of 59.5%. Male literacy was 80% and female literacy was 67%. In 2001, 14% of the population was under 6 years of age.

Climate
The climate of the Osmanabad district is generally dry. The rainy season starts from mid-June and continues until the end of September. From October to November, the climate is humid while from February to March the climate is dry. Winter runs from mid-November to January and summer from April to June. During summer the temperatures of Osmanabad district are low compared to other districts of the Marathwada region.

Education
Osmanabad has one Government BAMS College, known As Ayurvedic College, one Government Polytechnic College, Osmanabad Government Polytechnic College, Osmanabad (GPO), three private pharmacy colleges, and three private engineering colleges (Notably TPCT's College of Engineering, Osmanabad). Another engineering college in Osmanabad District is located in Tuljapur. The Tata Institute of Social Sciences, Mumbai, a university of international repute has begun a B.A., M.A., Mphil. and PhD program located in Tuljapur. Osmanabad City's most popular college for Higher secondary education Is Ramkrishna Paramhans Mahavidyalaya (R.P. College). Another one Venkatesh Mahajan Senior College is also floushing since 1999. Osmanabad has a Government Agriculture college (under Marathwada Agriculture University, Parbhani) near Ter village.

Osmanabad also has a sub-centre of Dr. Babasaheb Ambedkar Marathwada University, Aurangabad, which includes the Department of Management Science, Department of Education, Department of Chemistry, Department of Biotechnology, Department of Microbiology, etc. In Osmanabad Shri Tuljabhavani Sainiki Vidyalay is also present providing military education. Jawahar Navodaya Vidyalaya is also present in Tuljapur.

Arya Chanakya High School, Shree Chhatrapati Shivaji High School, Greenland CBSE school, Podar International School, Shripatrao Bhosale High School, Little Star School are few of the Schools for primary and secondary education. These schools provide education in Marathi, English or Semi-English medium of instruction. These schools are affiliated to MSBSHSE or CBSE.

Osmanabad also has an Urdu Higher School known as Shamsul Uloom Urdu Higher And Secondary School, located at Khawaja nagar. Osmanabad has many schools for English medium education as well, including Greenland high school, Vidyamata high school and Abhinav English School.

Tourism

Dharashiv Caves
There are two groups of rock-cut caves in Osmanabad city. the first is Chamar rock-cut caves and the other is the Dharasiv Rock-cut caves group. Chamar Caves are two km away from the city. There are two caves dedicated to Hinduism. According to Burgess, these are dated to the 6th century CE. Dharashiva Caves are Six in number, out of the four are of Jainas and two of Vaishnava caves. According to scholars these caves dated to the 6th to 8th century CE.

Dharashiv Caves are dating back to 7th Century A.D.It is a major tourists attraction in Osmanabad. The Railway bridge near the tunnel near Osmanabad City is also becoming a tourist destination nowadays.

Yedshi Ramling Wildlife Sanctuary 
Yedshi Ramling Wildlife Sanctuary is found in the villages of Yedshi, Wadgaon and Bhanasgaon near Osmanabad City in the Balaghat range. Yedshi is regarded to be the Matheran forest of the Osmanabad district. Yedshi is considered as a possible hill station-cum-health resort. It is a railway station on the Miraj-Latur broad gauge railway.

One object of interest nearby is the temple of Ramling. Situated about two miles from Yedshi, Ramling was a railway station on the Miraej-Latur narrow gauge section of the South-Central Railway. The temple is located in a ravine so deep that the temple's spire cannot be seen from a distance and even after reaching the temple entrance gate. To reach the temple one descends a number of steps. The temple has an open courtyard with a sabhamandap and a pindi of Shankar placed in an inner chamber. Many devotees flock to the temple every Monday in the month of Shravana. An annual fair is held in honour of Shri Ramling on Margashirsha Shuddha 4th and 5th (November–December). More than five thousand people assemble here at the time of the fair. The temple of Ramling is also a shrine of Jatayu.

The place is also revered, considered to be the spot where Jatayu attacked Ravana, the king of Lanka, while he was carrying away Sita by force. Jatayu lost the battle and died at the hands of Ravana.

Dry deciduous forests occupy the area. Wildlife species include chinkara, hyena, wolf, wild bear, fox, blackbuck, hares and seacock. Over 100 species of birds are also found. The best time to visit is from October to June.

Hatladevi
It is also called mini hill station of Osmanabad. hatlai devi temple, sunrisepoint are some of the few attractions on the Hatladevi hill. The scenario of Hatlai lake adds beauty to the place here. Hatladevi is quite famous among tourists and youths.

Dargah

A Sufi shrine is in the city, built over the grave of a revered religious figure of Hazrat Khwaja Shamsuddin Gazi(rh). The interior decoration of the Dargah consists  many colorful glass pieces. The Urs of Hazrat Khwaja Shamsuddin Gazi(rh) festival celebrates in the city in the month of Rajjab of the Islamic calendar.

Other places
Tuljapur: Tulajpur is home to Aai Tulja Bhavani which is the most visited palace by devotees from all over Maharashtra.
Naldurg Fort: It is in Naldurg town
Paranda Fort: Paranda Fort is situated in Paranda, a small town in Osmanabad district in the state of Maharashtra, India. It is a protected monument by the Archaeological Survey Of India. It is an example of military architecture and engineering in Maharashtra and was erected by Mahmud Gawan Vazir of Bahamani Sultanate.
Dhoki is a major village that is nearby Osmanabad
Kond is the village that has the historical Bhimashankar Mandir.
Ter is the birthplace of Sant Gora Kumbhar, having the historical Mandir.
Shri Datta Mandir Sansthan Ruibhar, Osmanabad: There is a temple of Lord Dattatreya amidst the quiet, serene natural surroundings at the village Ruibhar,  from Osmanabad city.
 Shri Yedeshwari Temple, Yermala: In this temple, the architecture is in the Hemadpanti style. It has two entrance doors, in front of the principal one are three dipmals or lamp pillars, the central one being a little taller than the flanking ones. Supported on two rows of solid pillars, the mandap has two rooms at one end, with the vestibule at the other end. The vestibule contains an idol of the goddess with a brass prabhaval around and a small linga symbol nearby.
Hemandpati Mahadev mandir of Omerga - Story is it was built in one night by asuras

Cuisine 

Osmanabad is also known for sweet Gulab Jamun made up of khoa, maida and sugar.
Osmanabadi goat mutton is also a very famous item. The boiled mutton with Rassa or locally called Sherva (boiled water infused with local spices such as turmeric, ginger, garlic, coriander, red chili, black chili, etc.).

Entertainment Agency
Osmanabad district has many popular News media and entertainment agencies. Osmanabad. Osmanabad Live, Bhannat Gappa are some of the top media centres engaged in Helping and Entertaining community of the Osmanabad district and nearby Places. Local Newspaper like Dainik Sangharsh, is also quite popular here.

Transport

Air

There are no scheduled commercial air services to the airport. It takes about 15 to 20 minutes to reach the airport by car from the bus stand. Maharashtra Industrial Development Corporation has leased the airport to Reliance Airport Developers, Ltd. for 95 years. Reliance paid Rs. 63 crore in the agreement, which includes four other airports of Maharashtra. The nearest operational airports are Aurangabad Airport and Nanded Airport.

Rail

Osmanabad railway station (station code UMD) is an important railway station situated on Latur - Miraj railway route of the central railway. Before 2004, a narrow gauge track connecting Latur to Kurduvadi passed through the Osmanabad district. During the conversion from narrow gauge to Broad Gauge, the track alignment was changed and directed towards Osmanabad City. In the first stage, the broad gauge track between Latur-Osmanabad was completed and became functional in 2007. The first train to arrive at Osmanabad railway station was the Mumbai-Osmanabad Express that ran via Aurangabad and Manmad. The Osmanabad-Kurudvadi section was completed and put into service in 2008. Latur-Osmanabad-Mumbai Express was started via Kurduvadi, Pune in 2008.
Osmanabad railway station operates under the Solapur Mandal of Central Railway (CR) zone.

Osmanabad has connections to Pune, Mumbai, Kolhapur, Sangli, Pandharpur, Nagpur, Parbhani, Latur, Nanded, Miraj, Parali Vaijnath, Hyderabad, and Nizamabad.

Road
National Highway 52 passes through Osmanabad city. This National Highway connects cities such as Sangrur(Punjab)-Hisar(Haryana)-Kota(Rajasthan)-Indore(Madhya Pradesh)-Dhule-Aurangabad-Beed-Osmanabad-Tuljapur-Solapur-Vijayapura-Hubballi-Ankola(Karnataka).

Maharashtra State Highway 67 also passes through Osmanabad City.

Nation highway 65 passes through Omerga city. it has also bypass to the city to avoid city traffic. it starts from Pune and run till Vishakhapatnam

References

External links 
 Osmanabad Business Directory
 Osmanabad Online Archive
Cities and towns in Osmanabad district
Osmanabad district
Talukas in Maharashtra
Cities in Maharashtra